Bogdan Racovițan (6 June 2000) is a professional footballer who plays as a centre-back for Ekstraklasa club Raków Częstochowa. Born in France, he represents Romania at under-21 international level.

Club career
Born in France, Racovițan served as captain for Dijon's youth sides and its reserves team. With the latter, he totalled 23 games and two goals in the Championnat National 3 between 2019 and 2021.

In February 2021, aged 20, Racovițan signed for FC Botoșani in Romania. He recorded his debut for the team on 6 May, in a 1–3 Liga I home loss to FCSB. On 23 October, he netted his first league goal in a 1–1 draw at CS Mioveni.

On 27 January 2022, he moved to Polish Ekstraklasa runner-ups Raków Częstochowa on a three-and-a-half-year deal.

Personal life
Racovițan was born in Dijon to a French mother and Romanian father from Oradea. He stated that he dreams of representing the Romania national team.

Career statistics

Club

Honours
Raków Częstochowa
Polish Cup: 2021–22
Polish Super Cup: 2022

References

External links
 
 

2000 births
Living people
Sportspeople from Dijon
French people of Romanian descent
Romanian people of French descent
Romanian footballers
Romania youth international footballers
Romania under-21 international footballers
Association football defenders
Championnat National 3 players
Liga I players
Dijon FCO players
FC Botoșani players
Ekstraklasa players
Raków Częstochowa players
Romanian expatriate footballers
French footballers
Expatriate footballers in Poland
Footballers from Bourgogne-Franche-Comté
Romanian expatriate sportspeople in Poland
French expatriate footballers
French expatriate sportspeople in Poland